Jamie Peter Hill (born 5 February 1981) is a New Zealand international lawn bowler.

Bowls career

Commonwealth Games
Hill represented New Zealand in the pairs at the 2006 Commonwealth Games in Melbourne.

Asia Pacific
Hill has won five medals at the Asia Pacific Bowls Championships including a gold medal in 2003 and a double silver in the triples and fours at the 2019 Asia Pacific Bowls Championships in the Gold Coast, Queensland.

National
Hill became the youngest player to represent New Zealand in 2003 when aged 22. He has won four national titles; after winning the fours title in successive years (2002 and 2003) bowling for Avondale Bowling Club and 17 years later in 2020 for Mount Albert. The following year he partnered Lance Pascoe when winning the 2021 pairs title.

References

External links
 
 
 

1981 births
Living people
New Zealand male bowls players
Bowls players at the 2006 Commonwealth Games
Commonwealth Games competitors for New Zealand